The 1997 Cornell Big Red football team was an American football team that represented Cornell University during the 1997 NCAA Division I-AA football season. Cornell tied for third in the Ivy League. 

In its eighth and final season under head coach Jim Hofher, the team compiled a 6–4 record and outscored opponents 269 to 261. Chris Allen, Justin Bird, Scott Carroll, Eric Krawczyk and Rich Sheerin were the team captains. 

Despite a 4–3 conference record that tied for third in the Ivy League standings, the Big Red were outscored by Ivy opponents, 170 to 145. Cornell originally finished in a tie for fourth place, but after the season ended, third-place Penn forfeited all of its league wins, dropping to last place and allowing Brown and Cornell to move up to third.

Cornell played its home games at Schoellkopf Field in Ithaca, New York.

Schedule

Note

References

Cornell
Cornell Big Red football seasons
Cornell Big Red football